Charity Shield may refer to:

 Charity Shield (NRL), awarded in an annual National Rugby League match
 FA Charity Shield, previous name of the FA Community Shield
 Rugby League Charity Shield (Great Britain)
 Irish FA Charity Shield
 Malaysian Charity Shield, or Sultan Haji Ahmad Shah Cup
 Maldivian FA Charity Shield
 Singapore Charity Shield
 Sheriff of London Charity Shield
 Surrey Charity Shield
 Trinidad and Tobago Charity Shield

See also 
 Community Shield (disambiguation)